The Angkula language, or Ogh Angkula, is an extinct Paman language of the Cape York Peninsula in Queensland, Australia. It was close to Alungul.

References

Thaypan languages
Extinct languages of Queensland